The Virginia Slims Circuit was a tennis tour consisting of a group of originally nine female professional players. Formed in 1970, the Virginia Slims Circuit eventually became the basis for the later WTA Tour. The players, dubbed the Original 9, rebelled against the United States Lawn Tennis Association (USLTA) because of the wide inequality between the amount of prize money paid to male tennis players and to female tennis players.

Background
The Open era began with the British Hard Court Championships in Bournemouth in 1968. At the first Open Wimbledon, the prize-fund difference was 2.5:1 in favour of men. Billie Jean King won £750 for taking the title, while Rod Laver took £2,000. The total purses of the competitions were £14,800 for men and £5,680 for women. By the 1970s, the pay difference which had been a 2.5:1 ratio between men and women had increased. In 1969, ratios of 5:1 in terms of pay were common at smaller tournaments; by 1970, these figures increased to 8:1 and even 12:1.

The situation came to a head in 1970, when most tournaments offered four times as much prize money to men than they did to women.  At the 1970 Italian Open, men's singles champion Ilie Năstase was paid US$3,500 while women's singles champion King received just US$600. On top of this, the USLTA failed to organise any tournaments for women in 1970.

The campaign

King and eight other female tennis players – Americans Rosemary Casals, Nancy Richey, Peaches Bartkowicz, Kristy Pigeon, Valerie Ziegenfuss, and Julie Heldman; and Australians Kerry Melville Reid and Judy Tegart Dalton – decided to enlist World Tennis magazine publisher Gladys Heldman to help negotiate for greater equality in prize money and provide valuable public relations assistance. All the players were putting their tennis careers at risk because the influential USLTA did not back them.

Gladys Heldman and the "Original 9" decided to target the Pacific Southwest Championships held in Los Angeles on the grounds that it paid eight times more money to men than it did to women. Heldman attempted to get the tournament chairman, former professional tennis player Jack Kramer, to reduce the inequality between the prize money purses for men and women. Kramer refused, leading the "Original 9" to declare at a press conference held at Forest Hills, New York that they would boycott the Pacific Southwest Championships and play at what would become the first Virginia Slims Circuit event, a US$7,500 tournament held in Houston, Texas in September 1970. Despite the USLTA's declaration that it would not sanction this event, the "Original 9" went ahead, with Casals defeating Dalton in the final 5–7, 6–1, 7–5.

The formation

Heldman, with the assistance of Joe Cullman of Philip Morris, then offered US$5,000 out of her own pocket to allow the "Original 9" to sign token $1 contracts and set up their own tour of eight professional tournaments in 1970. The tour was sponsored by Virginia Slims. This independent women's professional tennis circuit provided more equal prize money than had been provided previously by the USLTA and other organisations. Despite the USLTA's suspension of the "Original 9" from its tournaments, by the end of the year the Virginia Slims Circuit was able to boost its numbers from nine to forty members, which helped pave the way for the first full year season of the Circuit in 1971. Subsequently, in the aftermath of the creation of the Women's Tennis Association in 1973, the Virginia Slims Circuit would eventually absorb the ILTF's Women's Grand Prix circuit and become the WTA Tour.

See also
History of tennis

References
General
 
 

Specific

Further reading

Defunct tennis tours

History of tennis